Ingo Feistle (born 14 December 1981) is a German footballer who played in the 3. Liga.

External links

1981 births
Living people
German footballers
FC Augsburg players
1. FC Heidenheim players
3. Liga players
Association football fullbacks
People from Landsberg am Lech
Sportspeople from Upper Bavaria
Footballers from Bavaria